A bhuj  is a type of knife or dagger from Sindh and Gujarat. It is commonly called an axe-knife, because the blade is fixed onto an axe-like haft. The weapon takes its name from the city of Bhuj in the Kutch district of the state of Gujarat, where it originated, though it may have also originated in Sindh. The bhuj is short, broad, stout, and heavy, with a mild curve. It often sports an engraved and gilded mount, inlaid haft and decorated knob. This knob is typically a stylized elephant head, giving the weapon the nickname elephant knife. The short re-curved blade measures 7–10inches long, and its copper sheath makes the weapon 20inches long in total. It is mostly single-edged, except for a slight rear edge at the tip. The blade is mounted at a right angle to a metal haft in a manner similar to a long axe. The haft is sometimes hollow, concealing another small stiletto-like dagger. The weapon is similar to the Punjabi gandasa or the European glaive. The weapon was popular among the Sindhi cavalry of the Soomra and Samma dynasties of Sindh.

References

Sources 
The complete encyclopedia of arms and weapons, Edited by Leonid Tarassuk and Claude Blair, Bonanza books (Crown)

Weapons of India
Knives
Blade weapons
Indian melee weapons
Bhuj